Citropten is a natural organic compound with the molecular formula C11H10O4.  It is found in the essential oils of citrus such as lime, lemon, and bergamot.

References

Coumarins
Resorcinol ethers